Acharapakkam (SC) was a state assembly constituency in Kancheepuram district in the Indian state of Tamil Nadu. It included the town, Acharapakkam. . Acharapakkam assembly constituency (SC) was part of Chengalpattu (Lok Sabha constituency) which is now defunct.

Members of Legislative Assembly

Election Results

2006

Bye-election, 2002
Source: The Hindu
The MDMK, did not contest this seat, instead supported the PMK candidate, which also got the support of DMK and BJP.

2001

1996

1991

1989

1984

1980

1977

1971

1967

1962

References

External links
 

Former assembly constituencies of Tamil Nadu
Kanchipuram district